"Loungin" is the third and final single by American rapper LL Cool J from his sixth studio album Mr. Smith. It was released as a single by Def Jam Recordings on June 25, 1996. The LP version was produced by Rashad "Ringo" Smith and featured backing vocals by R&B duo Terri & Monica. The Radio Remix Edit, titled "Loungin (Who Do Ya Luv)", was remixed by Trackmasters and featured backing vocals by R&B group Total.

"Loungin (Who Do Ya Luv)" was also featured in the compilation All World: Greatest Hits and also appeared in an episode of LL's sitcom, In The House.

Reception
The single was a success, peaking at number three on the Billboard Hot 100, number one on Hot Rap Singles and number four on Hot R&B/Hip-Hop Songs. It sold 1.3 million copies, earning a platinum certification from the RIAA.

Samples
This original LP version features a sample of "Nite and Day" by singer Al B. Sure!. The Radio Remix Edit sampled "Who Do You Love" by singer and keyboardist Bernard Wright.

Music video
The music video featured the "Loungin (Who Do Ya Luv)" version and was directed by Hype Williams. It included a cameo from Funkmaster Flex as well as performance shots from the group Total. The video depicts LL Cool J having an affair with a woman who is unhappy in her relationship.

Track listing

A-side
"Loungin'" (Radio Remix Edit)- 3:45
"Loungin'" (LP Radio Edit)- 3:59

B-side
"Loungin'" (LP Version)- 4:10
"Summer Luv" -4:38

Charts

Weekly charts

Year-end charts

Certifications

References

1996 singles
LL Cool J songs
Music videos directed by Hype Williams
Songs written by LL Cool J
Songs written by Rashad Smith
Songs written by Jean-Claude Olivier
Songs written by Samuel Barnes (songwriter)
Songs written by Al B. Sure!
1995 songs
Def Jam Recordings singles